Nationality words link to articles with information on the nation's poetry or literature (for instance, Irish or France).

Events

Works
 Samuel Daniel, Certaine Small Workes, the fourth collected edition of his works
 John Davies, Yehovah Summa Totalis; or, All in All, and, the Same for Ever; or, An Addition to Mirum in Modum
 Michael Drayton, The Legend of Great Cromwel
 Thomas Ford, Musicke of  kindes
 Sir John Harington, translator (from the Latin of Johannes de Mediolano's Regimen sanitatis Salernitanum), The Englishmans Doctor; or, The Schole of Salerne
 Robert Jones, The First Set of Madrigals (verse and music)
 Gervase Markham, Rodomonths Infernall; or, The Divell Conquered, translated from Philippe Desportes' French translation of Ariosto's Orlando Furioso
 Samuel Rowlands:
 Democritus; or, Doctor Merry-man his Medicines, Against Melancholy Humors
 Diogines Lanthorne

Births
 March 12 – Paul Gerhardt (died 1676), German hymn writer
 March 8 – Johann von Rist (died 1667), German
 April 13 (bapt.) – Robert Chamberlain (died 1660), English poet and dramatist
 November 1 – Georg Philipp Harsdorffer (died 1658), German poet and translator
 November 5 – Anna Maria van Schurman (died 1678), Dutch
date unknown
 Alaol (died 1673), Bengali
 Václav František Kocmánek (died 1679), Czech poet, author and historian
 1607/1608: Salabega (died unknown), Oriyan religious poet

Deaths
 May – Sir Edward Dyer (born 1543), English courtier and poet
 c. May – Thomas Newton (born c. 1542), English physician, poet and translator
 June – Thomas Newton (born c. 1542), English physician, clergyman, poet, author and translator
 July 7 – Penelope Rich, Lady Rich (born 1563), English noblewoman, inspiration for Sir Philip Sidney's "Stella"
 September 18 – Abraham Fleming (born c. 1552), English poet, translator and antiquarian
Also:
 Henry Chettle, death year uncertain (born c. 1560), English playwright, writer and poet
 Dinko Ranjina (born 1536), Croatian

Notes

17th-century poetry
Poetry